Farrukh Raza (born 23 March 1961) is a Pakistani former cricketer. He played thirteen first-class cricket matches for several domestic sides in Pakistan between 1984 and 1987.

See also
 List of Pakistan Automobiles Corporation cricketers

References

External links
 

1961 births
Living people
Pakistani cricketers
Pakistan Automobiles Corporation cricketers
Sargodha cricketers
Water and Power Development Authority cricketers
Cricketers from Sargodha